Messoud Efendiev (Azerbaijani: Məsud Əfəndiyev) is an Azerbaijani scientist. He was born in Zaqatala, Azerbaijan.

Career 
His distinguish thesis work was written in 1974/75 in the Moscow State University under supervision of Professors Mark Vishik and A.I.Snirelmann on topological methods in nonlinear analysis. His PhD thesis was written in the Moscow State University 1975/76–1978/79 on a global solvability of nonlinear Riemann–Hilbert problems which was defended  in 1980. His habilitation thesis was titled "Geometrical properties of nonlinear mapping related to pseudodifferential operators and their topological degree" and was defended in 1998 in the Free University Berlin.

He worked from 1991 to 1994 in the University of Stuttgart, from 1994 to 1999 in Free University Berlin and from 2000 to 2005 as a Geschäftsführer of SFB project “Multifield Problems”. From 2005 to 2007 he worked as a visiting Professor in Technical University of Munich and in 2007–2013 he was head of Department “Dynamical Systems” in  the “Institute of Biomathematics  and Biometry” in the Helmholtz Center Munich. He is currently working as one of the leading scientists in Helmholtz Zentrum München (Institute of Computational Biology).

He is Editor in Chief of the  International Journal of Biomathematics and Biostatistics, as well as a member of Editorial Boards of many leading international Journals, in particular, such as  Mathematical Methods in the Applied Sciences, Glasgow Journal of Mathematics,  Journal of Nonautonomous and Stochastic Dynamical Systems, Advances in Mathematical Sciences and Applications, Journal of Coupled Systems and Multiscale Dynamics,  American Institute of Mathematical Sciences (AIMS) – book series Differential Equations and Dynamical Systems etc.

He has made many important contributions in nonlinear analysis, topological invariants and global solvability of nonlinear boundary value problems related to pseudodifferential operators, in particular, on global solvability of classical nonlinear Riemann–Hilbert problems. His current research interest include infinite-dimensional dynamical systems and dimension as well as asymptotics of Kolmogorov entropy  of their attractors, mathematical modelling of life science problems, especially  in medicine, biology and ecology and their long-time dynamics. For these latter topics he obtained JSPS as well as Otto Monsted fellowship. In all areas mentioned above he has obtained significant results which are reflected in his invitations to many international conferences as a keynote speaker. He has published more than 160 journal and conferences papers and 7 advanced monographs published by leading publishers, Springer, Birkhäuser, American Mathematical Society (series of Mathematical Surveys and Monographs), Gakkotoscho-Japan, and American Institute of Mathematical Sciences.
He has collaborated with many distinguished mathematicians in many countries. He was awarded Feodor Lynen Research Fellowship for Experienced Researchers by the Alexander von Humboldt Foundation
In 2018 he became a Deans Distinguished Visiting Professor in the University of Toronto and in the Fields Institute. In 2019 he received the James D.Murray Distinguished Visiting Professor in the University of Waterloo. It is worth noting that, in USA and Canada such prestigious titles and positions are as a rule awarded to nominated Nobel Laureates and Fields Medalists.

Sources
Helmholtz Zentrum München – German Research Center for Environmental Health Nonlinear Phenomena in Biology, Physics and Mechanics

References

1953 births
20th-century Azerbaijani mathematicians
Azerbaijani professors
Living people
People from Zaqatala
Academic staff of the Free University of Berlin
21st-century Azerbaijani mathematicians